Rick Shepas (born March 16, 1965) is a former American football player and coach.  He served as the head football coach at the Waynesburg University in Waynesburg, Pennsylvania from 2005 to 2016, compiling a record of 69–55.

Head coaching record

College

References

External links
 Waynesburg profile

1965 births
Living people
American football wide receivers
Pittsburgh Gladiators players
Waynesburg Yellow Jackets football coaches
Youngstown State Penguins football players
High school football coaches in Ohio
High school football coaches in Pennsylvania
Ashland University alumni
Coaches of American football from Ohio
Players of American football from Youngstown, Ohio